The 2003 Spanish regional elections were held on Sunday, 25 May 2003, to elect the regional parliaments of thirteen of the seventeen autonomous communities—Aragon, Asturias, the Balearic Islands, the Canary Islands, Cantabria, Castile and León, Castilla–La Mancha, Extremadura, La Rioja, Madrid, Murcia, Navarre and the Valencian Community—, not including Andalusia, the Basque Country, Catalonia and Galicia, which had separate electoral cycles. 792 of 1,186 seats in the regional parliaments were up for election, as well as the 50 seats in the regional assemblies of Ceuta and Melilla. The elections were held simultaneously with local elections all throughout Spain.

Election date
Determination of election day varied depending on the autonomous community, with each one having competency to establish its own regulations. Typically, thirteen out of the seventeen autonomous communities—all but Andalusia, the Basque Country, Catalonia and Galicia—had their elections fixed for the fourth Sunday of May every four years, to be held together with nationwide local elections.

In some cases, regional presidents had the prerogative to dissolve the regional parliament and call for extra elections at a different time, but newly elected assemblies were restricted to serving out what remained of their previous four year-terms without altering the period to their next ordinary election.

Campaign
Parties campaigned for votes in both these elections and the local elections held at the same time. Some key issues that kept coming up for parties were:
 The Prestige oil spill: This occurred in November 2002 and caused an oil spill affecting the coast of Galicia and parts of Cantabria. Parties reported this was affecting voter habits in the north of the country.
 The National Hydrological Plan (Spanish: Plan Hidrológico Nacional): This was a multi-million-euro water management project causing rifts between governments of communities affected, transferring some of the water from the Ebro to the driest areas of Murcia and Valencia. Whilst both of these regions supported the proposal, Aragon and Catalonia did not.
 Terrorism: In 2003 there had been only three deaths from terrorist attacks in Spain, unusually low. However, political discussions between Madrid and the Basque Government did not cease during the previous Parliament. Certain parties accused the PP of using this to their political advantage.

Regional governments
The following table lists party control in autonomous communities. Gains for a party are highlighted in that party's colour.

Overall results

Summary by region

Aragon

Asturias

Balearic Islands

Canary Islands

Cantabria

Castile and León

Castilla–La Mancha

Extremadura

La Rioja

Madrid

May

October

Murcia

Navarre

Valencian Community

Autonomous cities

Ceuta

Melilla

Notes

References

External links
www.juntaelectoralcentral.es (in Spanish). Central Electoral Commission – Regional elections
www.argos.gva.es (in Spanish). Argos Information Portal – Electoral Historical Archive
www.historiaelectoral.com (in Spanish and Catalan). Electoral History – Regional elections since 1980

2003